The Museum of Imaginary Animals is the fifth album by the English band Pram, released in 2000.

Critical reception
Exclaim! wrote: "It's rare that a band can be this eccentric and daring without sounding contrived or wilfully obscure, but there's an abiding organicism at the heart of Pram that keeps them, well, not exactly grounded, but welcoming." The Washington Post wrote that "Pram isn't as out there as it wants to be, but much of The Museum of Imaginary Animals draws you in." NME deemed the album "fractured and spindly, plundering post-rock and jazz and dub, without really sounding like any of them."

Track listing

Personnel 
Rosie Cuckston – vocals, keyboards, omnichord
Matt Eaton - guitar, bass guitar, sampler, keyboards
Sam Owen –  bass guitar, guitar, keyboards, accordion, woodwind
Max Simpson – keyboards, sampler
Stephen Perkins – drums, percussion
Alex Clare – trumpet, trombone
Nick Sales – keyboards, guitar, woodwind, theremin, sampler

References

External links
Metroactive Music - 'Musical Animals' by Michelle Goldberg
Information on Domino Records
The Museum of Imaginary Animals on Discogs

2000 albums
Pram (band) albums